Frederic Lewis Donaldson (born Ladywood 10 September 1860;  died Westminster 7 October 1953) was an Anglican priest, most notably Archdeacon of Westminster from 1937 to 1946.

In 1885 Donaldson was educated at Christ Church Cathedral School and Merton College, Oxford, graduating B.A. in 1884. He was ordained Deacon in 1884; and Priest in 1885. While Curate at St Nicholas Cole Abbey he married Louise Eagleston: they had two sons and four daughters. After further curacies in Piccadilly Circus and Hammersmith he was appointed Rector of Nailstone. He was Vicar of St Mark, Leicester from 1896 to 1918; and then of Paston until 1924. He was a Canon of Westminster from 1924 to 1951; Sub-Dean, 1944–1951, Steward, 1927–1931, Treasurer, 1931–1951, and Receiver-General, 1938–1951.

Donaldson was a founder member of the Church Socialist League, and chaired the organisation from 1913 until 1916.  He was also an early member of the Christian Social Union, sat on the council of the Industrial Christian Fellowship.  He was a leader of a march of unemployed workers from Leicester to London, in 1905. In 1913, Donaldson led a deputation of Church of England clergy to the prime minister, H. H. Asquith, demanding women's suffrage. Being passionate about world peace, he was the president of the London Council for the Prevention of War (1927) and chairman of the League of Clergy for Peace (1931–40).

References

19th-century English Anglican priests
20th-century English Anglican priests
1860 births
People from Ladywood
People educated at Christ Church Cathedral School
Alumni of Merton College, Oxford
1953 deaths
Archdeacons of Westminster